2000 Malta Open is a darts tournament, which took place in Malta in 2000.

Results

References

2000 in darts
2000 in Maltese sport
Darts in Malta